Azizabad (also Romanized as ‘Azīzābād) is a village in Dinavar Rural District, Dinavar District, Sahneh County, Kermanshah Province, Iran. At the 2006 census, its population was 199, in 41 families.

References 

Populated places in Sahneh County